The High School for Gifted Students, Hanoi National University of Education (abbrev. HNUE High School, in Vietnamese: Trường THPT chuyên, Đại học Sư phạm Hà Nội, or, as commonly known, Chuyên Sư phạm (CSP)) is a public magnet school in Hanoi, Vietnam. The school was founded in 1966 as a national educational institution to nurture Vietnamese students who excelled at mathematics. HNUE High School is the second oldest magnet high school in Vietnam and one of the seven national-level high schools for the gifted.

The school and HUS High School for Gifted Students are often interchangeably ranked the first in National Science Olympiads for high school students and National University Entrance Examinations. Its students have won about 100 medals at the International Science Olympiads. Its alumni include 4 ministers in the Vietnamese governments, leading scientists at top domestic and foreign universities, notable Vietnamese entrepreneurs and recognized artists.

HNUE High School is the most selective school in Vietnam. The 2022 acceptance rate is 5.5% (1 seat for every 18 applicants) and for some classes, the acceptance rate is 3% (1 slot for 31 applicants). Students are chosen either through exceptional academic achievement in junior secondary school (10% of intake) or through a rigorous nationwide entrance exam (90%).

The school’s alumni include key leaders at the Ministry of Foreign Affairs of Vietnam, the Ministry of Information and Communications of Vietnam, Vietnam National University, Ho Chi Minh City, Hanoi Medical University, Vietnam Academy of Science and Technology,  researchers and professors at Oxford University, MIT, Stanford University, NASA, National University of Singapore, Sorbonne University, Microsoft, Google... business leaders and founders of McKinsey & Company, Sabeco,  Bkav (company), FPT Corporation, Gemadept…

Foundation and history 
During the Vietnam War, aware of the important role of sciences for future of the country, a group of Vietnam leading scientists including Lê Văn Thiêm, Hoàng Tụy and Tạ Quang Bửu suggested that the government open up selective programs to nurture talented students, and to encourage them to follow science in their later years at universities and professions. As a premier national institution for training of science teachers, Hanoi National University of Education was selected to organize such a program. On December 24, 1966, at the height of the Vietnam War, the first class for gifted students was inaugurated with 33 mathematically inclined students, who were chosen from thousands of high school students in North Vietnam, at the evacuation site of the university in Phù Cừ District, Hưng Yên Province. This class was the foundation of HNUE High School.

The history of Hanoi National University of Education High School is divided three periods:
 From 1966 to 1995, the special math classes were under the administration of the faculty of Mathematics, Hanoi National University of Education.
 In 1995, the school expanded to include a specialized stream in Computer Science. It was then renamed Specialized School for Maths and Computer Science.
 In 2005, the school started offering classes specialized in Literature, Physics, Chemistry and Biology and was named "High School for Gifted Students of Hanoi National University of Education".

The HNUE High School was honored with many national awards, including the third degree Labor Decoration award in 1986, the second degree Labor Decoration in 1996, and most recently the first degree Labor Decoration (2001).

Education

Admissions 
In the first period of establishment of the school in the 80s, HNUE High School for Gifted Students did not directly handle the admission process; this work was taken by the Ministry of Education and Training. During this period, students with outstanding abilities in mathematics (only in Northern region, from Nam Dinh province northwards) were nominated by the region to the Ministry of Education and Training before participating in an entrance exam. Students who passed the exam would be divided two schools: High School for Gifted Students, Hanoi University of Science and HNUE High School for Gifted Students or HSGS High School for Gifted Students.
Since the end of 1980, with the wave of eradication of subsidy mechanism, HNUE High School for Gifted Students and HSGS High School for Gifted Students directly handle their own admission process.

The school's entrance examinations are held in June, attracts students from all over the country. Candidates must take three compulsory papers on the first day of testing (Vietnamese language, Mathematics and English) and on the second day, one elective paper (from Mathematics, Literature, Physics, Chemistry, Biology, English studies ) for their specialization. These exams are highly competitive.

Education model 
The students are organized into specialized streams in one of the following subjects: Mathematics, Literature, Physics, Chemistry, Biology, Computer Science and English. Each stream is offered an accelerated curriculum on the subject of specialization. Seminars are held during the school year, at which students can discuss with national and international scientists and researchers.

Extra-curricular activities include sports, camping and clubs.

Teaching staff 
Members of the staff often provide annual training for national Olympiad teams for international competitions, and have been consulted for developing textbooks and curriculum for Vietnamese national high school education. In addition, many have received the Excellent Teacher Award from the government for their dedication to education.

Facilities 
As many students come from provinces far away from the main campus in Hanoi, the school provides room and board.The school has built a spacious facility with 40 classrooms, 2 Informatics practice rooms, an English classroom, 3 laboratories for subjects: Physics, Chemistry, Biology with full necessary equipment, one multi room...

Classrooms 
The main building of the school contains 24 classrooms and a multi-media room. Wireless internet access is available across the entire building.

Library 
Built in 2001, it meets the demand for reference and study material for teachers and students. It has hundreds of computers for internet access, along with spacious media rooms.

Laboratories 
There are two computer rooms where students practice Computer Science or use for study and reference or entertaining. Because of space shortage, the school does not have lab space for physics, chemistry and biology experiments, but the students are given access to facilities on the university main campus.

Dormitories 
The school provides students with dormitories. The residents have access to a canteen and an internet access point.

Stadium 
The students use Hanoi National University of Education stadium for physical education and sport events.

Student life

PTCMedia 
PTCMedia is the official media organization of HNUE High School. With the mission of reporting the details of the internal academic aspect and activities of students, as well as encouraging the student connections by organizing various events, PTCMedia has always been creative and critical to bringing the best to students. Our initial product is PTCTimes, the newspaper of HNUE High School. The first issue was published in December 2006. There are approximately 60 pages in each issue. A number of pages are always devoted to difficulties in studying. Each newspaper has an interview with a teacher or student. The recreation column deals with music, games, and sport. Besides print media, PTC also directs and provides digital products that demonstrate all sides of HNUE High School.

Events are an important part of PTCMedia's annual activities. The organization is behind the success of various events for students in all class standing. Fiesta A Cielo is currently the biggest event at HNUE High School, which normally lasts 2 weeks to 1 month. This is an opportunity for different classes to compete and have fun in sports, academics, games, and so on. Throughout different seasons, Fiesta A Cielo carries the virtues of a well-development environment for students, as well as representing the strength of HNUE High School students in all fields.

PTC Media is the oldest club in CSP.

SAGS 
SAGS is the abbreviation for "Studying Abroad for Gifted Students" - the organization concerning studying abroad orientation and English learning development. Founded in 2008, through six years of working seriously, enthusiastically and effectively, SAGS has created many helpful and interesting activities:
Founded and has administrated an English club since 2009.
Administrating two pages on Facebook: "The ySAGS" and "SAGS.CSP", which bring students helpful knowledge, information and video clips about studying abroad and learning English.
Holding big annual events: English speaking contest "U-talk", English singing contest "Stereo Hearts".
Hosting many conferences on studying abroad with the presence of universities representatives, famous lecturers, etc. from all around the world such as Ebroad - Studying Abroad Orientation and Developing English through seminars.
Holding and attending, supporting meaningful voluntary events: imFLOW (at National Institute of Hematology and Blood Transfusion), Youth Day (in Hanoi), Vitamin smile (at National Hospital of Pediatrics).
Christmas free transporting cards and gifts program: "Christmas Hearts transporter".
Annual prom on Halloween night.
Co-operating with other organizations to hold big events: LEMON's day (the biggest series of voluntary events in Hanoi by students), The Breakfast (annual orientation program for first year students), Puzzles (a debate club of Hanoi students), etc.

MCCM 
School music club where students who passionated about music can rehearsed and share their joy of music. The club usually participated in school performances, as well as having its own music events.

ECLUB 
With slogan "English Can Lead U Beyond", ECLUB is the one and only English Club for students of CSP. The club has two main events around the year: Fight the Krampus, Activate your Energy.

CDT 
The abbreviation for "CSP Dance Team".

Movies for Relief 
A charity organization. One of the biggest clubs of school. Their annual activities are Spring Melody, Red Carpet and more.

CSF 
CSF is the abbreviation for "CSP Sporting Federation", the first sport organization in the school history. Founded in 2013, CSF focuses on promoting three main sports which are soccer, basketball and badminton, holding both intramural and interscholastic competition for each sport. The winning teams will represent the school in the city tournaments.

C3 
C3 stands for "Chuyen Su pham (CSP) Cubing Club".

ASO 
ASO is the abbreviation for "Apply Science Organization".

ADaPT 
ADaPT is the first Information Technology club of HNUE High School. This is where students have a chance to participate in assembling high-tech products, have an experience like in Startup projects, or simply just try out unique machines. At the same time, ADaPT provides you a place to hang out, learn, and exchange knowledge and ideas with everyone.

ET Magic 
The first magic team where teammates can show their own skills in magic tricks.

HE 
"HE" is the abbreviation for "History for Everyone", a history club founded in 2016.

CDS 
CDS is the abbreviation for "Chuyen Su Pham (CSP) Debate Society", the school's first debate club with the aim of sparking a wider interest in formal debating within the CSP student community. Founded in 2017, the club provides students with the opportunity to develop and utilize their critical thinking, research, discussion and presentation skills as well as preparing potential individuals to compete in local, regional, and national tournaments. It also holds its own debate tournaments and a summer program dedicated to teaching debating skills. CDS has gained popularity in light of the succeed of Warm-up Debating Championship

Other extracurricular activities 
 Camping or sightseeing: During the summer vacation, the school organizes short tours for students. These activities may be replaced by camping.
 Clubs: There are sport clubs, English club, physics club, mathematics club (online) and the Readle, a literature appreciation club, for students. The sport clubs, physics club and mathematics club were all founded in 2013–2014. The Readle focuses not only upon book discussion but also organises Slam Poetry sessions.

Achievements

College admission 
100% of HNUE High school students pass the annual National University Entrance Examination and are admitted to universities in Vietnam. The average entrant score of HNUE students is always one of the highest in the country. 
After graduation, many students pursue higher education abroad and are scholars in world top universities.

National Olympiads 
Since its foundation, the School has attended national merit competitions annually and received more than 500 prizes, mainly in Math and Informatics, and about 50 of them are first prizes.

International Olympiads 
More than 50 students of the school have received high awards in international competitions, namely International Mathematics Olympiad (IMO), Asian Pacific Mathematics Olympiad (APMO), International Olympiad in Informatics (IOI), and International Biology Olympiad. Especially, Vu Ngoc Minh won two Gold medals ( at the 42nd and 43rd IMO ), Dinh Tien Cuong and Nguyen Trong Canh scored 42/42 point respectively at the 30th and 44th IMO.

International Mathematics Olympiad
 16th International Mathematical Olympiad in German Democratic Republic in 1974
 Vu Dinh Hoa " Silver medal
 Ta Hong Quang " Bronze medal
 17th International Mathematical Olympiad in Bulgaria in 1975
 Le Dinh Long " Silver medal
 18th International Mathematical Olympiad in Austria in 1976
 Le Ngoc Minh " Bronze medal
 20th International Mathematical Olympiad in Romania in 1978
 Vu Kim Tuan " Silver medal
 Nguyen Thanh Tung " Silver medal
 Do Duc Thai " Bronze medal
 21st International Mathematical Olympiad in the United Kingdom in 1979
 Bui Ta Long " Silver medal
 24th International Mathematical Olympiad in France in 1983
 Tran Tuan Hiep " Silver medal
 Pham Thanh Phuong " Bronze medal
 25th International Mathematical Olympiad in Czechoslovakia in 1984
 Do Quang Dai " Silver medal
 27th International Mathematical Olympiad in Poland in 1986
 Ha Anh Vu " Gold medal
 Nguyen Phuong Tuan " Silver medal
 28th International Mathematical Olympiad in Cuba in 1987
 Tran Trong Hung " Silver medal
 29th International Mathematical Olympiad in Australia in 1988
 Tran Trong Hung " Silver medal
 30th International Mathematical Olympiad in Germany in 1989
 Dinh Tien Cuong " Gold medal (score 42/42)
 31st International Mathematical Olympiad in China in 1990
 Le Truong Lan " Bronze medal
 32nd International Mathematical Olympiad in Sweden in 1991
 Nguyen Viet Anh " Silver medal
 33rd International Mathematical Olympiad in Russia in 1992
 Nguyen Huu Cuong " Bronze medal
 34th International Mathematical Olympiad in Turkey in 1993
 Pham Hong Kien " Silver medal
 Pham Chung Thuy " Bronze medal
 35th International Mathematical Olympiad in Hong Kong in 1994
 Nguyen Duy Lan " Silver medal
 36th International Mathematical Olympiad in Canada in 1995
 Nguyen The Phuong " Silver medal
 39th International Mathematical Olympiad in Taiwan in 1998
 Vu Viet Anh " Gold medal
 Le Thai Hoang " Bronze medal
 40th International Mathematical Olympiad in Romania in 1999
 Le Thai Hoang " Gold medal
 42nd International Mathematical Olympiad in the US in 2001
 Vu Ngoc Minh " Gold medal
 Tran Khanh Toan " Silver medal
 43rd International Mathematical Olympiad in the United Kingdom in 2002
 Pham Gia Vinh Anh " Gold medal
 Vu Ngoc Minh " Gold medal
 44th International Mathematical Olympiad in Japan in 2003
 Nguyen Trong Canh " Gold medal (score 42/42)
 45th International Mathematical Olympiad in Greece in 2004
 Nguyen Kim Son " Gold medal
 Nguyen Duc Thinh " Silver medal
 Hua Khac Nam " Silver medal
 46th International Mathematical Olympiad in Mexico in 2005
 Nguyen Nguyen Hung " Bronze medal
 49th International Mathematical Olympiad in Spain in 2008
 Nguyen Pham Dat " Silver medal

Asian Pacific Mathematics Olympiad
 10th Asian Pacific Mathematics Olympiad
 Vu Viet Anh " Bronze medal
 11th Asian Pacific Mathematics Olympiad
 Le Thai Hoang " Gold medal
 13th Asian Pacific Mathematics Olympiad
 Luu Tien Duc " Gold medal
 14th Asian Pacific Mathematics Olympiad
 Vu Hoang Hiep " Gold medal

International Olympiad in Informatics

 12th International Olympiad in Informatics in Turkey in 1999
 Nguyen Hong Son " Silver medal
 14th International Olympiad in Informatics in Finland in 2001
 Tran Quang Khai " Silver medal
 15th International Olympiad in Informatics in South Korea in 2002
 Tran Quang Khai " Gold medal
 20th International Olympiad in Informatics in Croatia in 2007
 Pham Nam Long - Bronze medal ( Great Britain Selected Team)
 23rd International Olympiad in Informatics in Thailand in 2011
 Nguyen Hoang Yen " Bronze medal 
 24th International Olympiad in Informatics in Italy in 2012
 Nguyen Viet Dung " Silver medal

International Biology Olympiad

 21st International Biology Olympiad in Korea in 2010
 Vu Thi Ngoc Oanh " Bronze medal
 22nd International Biology Olympiad in Taiwan in 2011
 Nguyen Trung Kien " Bronze medal
 23rd International Biology Olympiad in Singapore in 2012
 Nguyen Thi Ngoc Hong " Bronze medal
 24th International Biology Olympiad in Switzerland in 2013
 Nguyen Thi Phuong Diep " Bronze medal

Notable alumni

Politics and Public Service 
 Doan Xuan Hung - Former Deputy Minister of Ministry of Foreign Affairs of Vietnam and Ambassador to Japan and Germany.
 Nguyen Huy Dung - Deputy Minister, Ministry of Information and Communication
 Le Quoc Thinh - Vietnam Consulate General in Osaka, Japan.
 Nguyen Hoi Nghia - Former Deputy General Director of Ho Chi Minh City National University (Deputy Minister), member of the founding team of Gifted High School, National University of Ho Chi Minh City
 Nguyen Dinh Cong - Vice President of Vietnam Academy of Science and Technology (Deputy Minister), former deputy director of Institute of Mathematics of Vietnam.

Science 

 Nguyen Lan Viet - Former President of Hanoi Medical University, President Vietnam Heart Association, Deputy Director Vietnam Heart Institute.
 Ho Tu Bao - Director of Knowledge Creation Methodology Laboratory, Japan Advanced Institute of Science and Technology (JAIST), Member of Science Council Institute of Advanced Mathematics in Vietnam 
 Dinh Tien Cuong - Provost's Chair of Mathematics, National University of Singapore, Former Professor Sorbonne University, Member of Science Council Vietnam Advanced Mathematical Institute
 Do Duc Thai - Chair of Mathematics Department, Hanoi National University of Education, Member of Science Council Institute of Advanced Mathematics.
 Vũ Kim Tuấn - Distinguished Chair of the University of West Georgia, US.
 Nguyen Tu Cuong - Professor, Doctor of Mathematics Science, Institute of Mathematics of Vietnam.
 Nguyen Dong Yen - Professor, Doctor of Science in mathematics, Ta Quang Buu Prize 2015.
 Pham Duc Chinh - Professor, Doctor of Mechanical Science, Ta Quang Buu Award 2019.
 Ha Anh Vu - Honeywell International Center, United States.
 Nguyen Hong Thai - Professor at the Mathematics Institute of the University of Szczecin, Poland.

Business 
 Le Dinh Long - Development Director of Spark Social Enterprise Center, Former General Director International Bank of Vietnam (VIB), Former General Director Hong Leong Bank Vietnam.
 Nguyen Tu Quang - Founder and CEO of Technology Group Bkav.
 Do Van Minh - CEO of Gemandept Joint Stock Company ( HOSE: GMD)
 Dao Trong Khoa - Vice President of Vietnam Logistics Association
 Ha Thanh Tu - Local Partner McKinsey & Company

Other 
 Doan Minh Cuong (Course 1) - Former Head of the Division (equivalent to Rector) of the High School, Hanoi Pedagogical University.

References

External links 
"Results of Vietnam Teams at International Mathematical Olympiads".
 
 

High schools in Hanoi
High schools for the gifted in Vietnam
University-affiliated secondary schools
Educational institutions established in 1966
1966 establishments in North Vietnam